Belippa is a genus of moths in the family Limacodidae erected by Francis Walker in 1865.

Description
Antennae with proximal one-third is bipectinated in males, whereas ciliated in females. Palpi reaching vertex of head. Hind tibia with two pairs of spurs. Forewing with vein 7, 8 and 9 stalked. Hindwing with veins 6 and 7 from the cell.

Species
Belippa aeolus Solovyev & Witt, 2009 (Vietnam)
Belippa apicata Moore (India)
Belippa boninensis (Matsumura, 1931) (Japan)
Belippa cyanopasta Hampson, 1910 (Myanmar)
Belippa ferruginea Moore 1877 (India)
Belippa formosaensis Kawada, 1930
Belippa horrida Walker, 1865 (China, Japan, Taiwan)
Belippa lohor Moore (India, Java)
Belippa ochreata Yoshimoto, 1994 (India, China)
Belippa thoracica Moore, 1879 (India)

References

External links

Limacodidae genera
Limacodidae